Films and Filming was the longest-running British gay magazine prior to the partial decriminalisation of homosexuality in England and Wales.

Launched in 1954, the magazine included gay-themed articles and images (including profiles and images of actors such as Dirk Bogarde and Rock Hudson, whose sexualities were ambiguous at the time), commercial and personal advertisements featuring same-sex desire, and included articles on the censorship of gay themes in film and theatre.

Films and Filming was considered a mainstream and internationally-respected magazine throughout the 1950s and 1960s. It was widely available in bookshops and newsagents, and was the most successful title of Hansom Books.

Following the Sexual Offences Act 1967, when gay sex was partially decriminalised in England and Wales, the magazine was able to be more open and feature naked men on the cover.

References

LGBT-related magazines published in the United Kingdom
Magazines established in 1954
Film magazines published in the United Kingdom